

Quaternary

Holocene

Pleistocene
 Abag Formation
 A’ershan Formation

Neogene

Pliocene

Miocene

Paleogene

Oligocene

Eocene

Paleocene
 A’ertashi Formation

Cretaceous
 A’ergong Formation

Late (Upper)

Early (Lower)
 Dabeigou Formation
 Jianxing Formation
 Jiufotang Formation
 Tuchengzi Formation
 Xiagou Formation
 Yijinholuo Formation
 Yixian Formation

Jurassic

Late (Upper)
 Shaximiao Formation
 Suining Formation
 Tiaojishan Formation

Middle
 Ah Formation
 Haifanggou Formation

Early (Lower)
Lufeng formation

Triassic

Late (Upper)
 Adula Formation

Middle

Early (Lower)
 Aba Formation
 Zuosuo Formation

Paleozoic

Permian

Late
 Zuozuo Formation

Middle

Early
 A’erbasayi Formation
 A’ertushileike Formation
 Beipiao Formation

Carboniferous

Late
 Jianshanying Formation

Middle

Early

Devonian

Late (Upper)

Middle
 A’ermantie Formation

Early (Lower)
 A’ertaxi Formation
 Xikeng Formation

Silurian

Late
 Xikeng Formation
 Zusailing Formation

Middle

Early

Ordovician

Late (Upper)

Middle

Early (Lower)

Cambrian

Late (Upper)

Middle
 Abuqiehai Formation
 Zushimiao Formation

Early (Lower)

Proterozoic

Neoproterozoic
 Abor Formation
 Doushantuo Formation

Mesoproterozoic

Paleoproterozoic
 A’ertenghala Formation
 Xiheli Formation

Archean

Neoarchean
 Xihui Formation

Mesoarchean

Paleoarchean

Eoarchean

Formations